Ravish  Siddiqi (1911-1971) born Shahid Aziz at Jwalapur in District Saharanpur of United Provinces of Agra and Oudh on 11 July 1911 was a renowned Urdu Ghazal and Nazm writer whose forte was Romantic Poetry and Patriotic Poetry. A self-educated person he had studied and gained fluency in Urdu, Arabic, Persian, Hindi, Sanskrit and English.

Career
Ravish Siddiqi worked in the All India Radio at the time when Prem Nath Dar, Saghar Nizami and Salaam Machhalishahari were also working in the same institution. Ravish Siddiqi wrote both romantic and patriotic poetry, but most of his widely acclaimed poems were written on the beauty of the Kashmir valley and people of Kashmir, a collection of these poems, called Khayabaan Khayabaan"'''  was published in late 1970s. His  collection of ghazals titled  Mehrab-e-Ghazal   was published in 1956.

Death
He died in Shahjahanpur, Uttar Pradesh on 24 January 1971.

References

Urdu-language poets
1911 births
1971 deaths
20th-century poets